The 1995 PGA Tour of Australasia was a series of men's professional golf events played mainly in Australia and New Zealand.

Schedule
The following table lists official events during the 1995 season.

Order of Merit
The Order of Merit was based on prize money won during the season, calculated in Australian dollars.

Notes

References

External links

PGA Tour of Australasia
Australasia
PGA Tour of Australasia
PGA Tour of Australasia